Gök Nerede is Turkish pop and rock singer Mabel Matiz's third studio album, which was released on 13 February 2015 in Turkey.

Track listing

Sales

References

External links 
 
 Gök Nerede - iTunes

Mabel Matiz albums
2015 albums